Three Days of Adrenaline is the first live DVD by Japanese rock band Coldrain, released on December 7, 2011.

Three Days of Adrenaline was recorded in three cities: Osaka, Nagoya, and Tokyo. The track list contains all the songs of the album The Enemy Inside and some songs from Final Destination and Nothing Lasts Forever. The DVD has a special feature of Mah from the ska punk band SiM.

Due to the COVID-19 pandemic, many of Coldrain's gigs were forced to be postponed or cancelled. To entertain fans during the lockdown period, they released Three Days of Arenaline for free on YouTube for a limited time.

Track listing

Extra features

Personnel
  – lead vocals 
  – lead guitar
  – rhythm guitar, backing vocals
  – bass guitar, backing vocals
  – drums

Charts

References

External links
 

Coldrain albums
2011 live albums